Raches is a village and a former municipality on the island of Ikaria, North Aegean, Greece. Since the 2011 local government reform it is part of the municipality Ikaria, of which it is a municipal unit. With a population of 2,163 inhabitants (2011 census) and a land area of 101.768 km2, it is the largest in area, smallest in population, and therefore the least densely populated of the three municipal units on Icaria. The other two municipal units are Agios Kirykos and Evdilos.

External links
 Ikaria info

References

Populated places in Ikaria (regional unit)